Ulsan Gray Whale Migration Site is a natural monument located in Ulsan, South Korea. It was given National Natural Monument status on December 3, 1962. Each year, from the month of April until mid June, whales pass through Ulsan Gray Whale Migration Site, 20-30 kilometres from the Ulsan coast. It is a popular whale watching destination. Ulsan Whale Festival is hosted in the month of April each year.

See also 

 Gray whale

Natural monuments
Natural Monuments of South Korea
Whale watching